The Group of 77 (G77) at the United Nations (UN) is a coalition of 134 developing countries, designed to promote its members' collective economic interests and create an enhanced joint negotiating capacity in the United Nations. There were 77 founding members of the organization headquartered in Geneva, but it has since expanded to 134 member countries. Cuba holds its chairmanship for 2023, succeeding Pakistan.

The group was founded on 15 June 1964, by 77 non-aligned nations in the "Joint Declaration of the Seventy-Seven Countries" issued at the United Nations Conference on Trade and Development (UNCTAD). The first major meeting was in Algiers in 1967, where the Charter of Algiers was adopted and the basis for permanent institutional structures was begun under the leadership of Raul Prebisch who had previously worked at ECLA. There are Chapters of the Group of 77 in Geneva (UN), Rome (FAO), Vienna (UNIDO), Paris (UNESCO), Nairobi (UNEP) and the Group of 24 in Washington, D.C. (International Monetary Fund and World Bank).

Policies
The group was credited with a common stance against apartheid and for supporting global disarmament. It has been supportive of the New International Economic Order. It has been subject to criticism for its lacklustre support, or outright opposition, to pro-environmental initiatives, which the group considers secondary to economic development and poverty eradication initiatives.

Members 

As of 2020, the group comprises all of the UN member states (along with the U.N. observer State of Palestine), excluding the following countries:

 Members of the Council of Europe, except for Azerbaijan.
 Members of the Commonwealth of Independent States Free Trade Area, except for Tajikistan.
 Members of the Organisation for Economic Co-operation and Development, except for its three South American members.
 Two Pacific microstates: Palau and Tuvalu.

Current founding members

Other current members

Former members 
  signed the original "Joint Declaration of the Developing Countries" in October 1963 but pulled out of the group before the formation of the G77 in 1964 (it joined the OECD in 1973).
  was a founding member but left the Group after joining the OECD in 1994. It had presided over the group in 1973–1974, 1983–1984; however, it is still a member of G-24.
  was a founding member but left the Group after joining the OECD in 1996.
  was a founding member; by the late 1990s, it was still listed on the membership list, but it was noted that it "cannot participate in the activities of G77."  It was removed from the list in late 2003. It had presided over the group from 1985 to 1986. Bosnia and Herzegovina was the last former Yugoslavian state to be a member of the G77 and is no longer a member as of 2019.
  was a founding member but was no longer listed on the official membership list after it acceded to the European Union in 2004.
  was admitted to the Group in 1976 but was no longer listed on the official membership list after it acceded to the European Union in 2004.
  joined the Group in 2002 but withdrew in 2004, having decided that it could best pursue its environmental interests through the Alliance of Small Island States.
  was classed as a Latin American country for the purposes of the G77, having joined in 1976. The G77 was divided into geographical regions, and because there was technically no European area, Romania was placed under the umbrella of Latin America. Romania left the G77 following its accession to the European Union.

China 
The Group of 77 lists China as one of its members. The Chinese government provides consistent political support to the G77 and has made financial contributions to the Group since 1994, but it does not consider itself to be a member. As a result, official statements of the G77 are delivered in the name of The Group of 77 and China or G77+China.

Presiding countries 
The following is the chain of succession of the chairmanship of the G77:

Group of 24

The Group of 24 (G-24) is a chapter of the G-77 that was established in 1971 to coordinate the positions of developing countries on international monetary and development finance issues and to ensure that their interests were adequately represented in negotiations on international monetary matters. Every member of the G-24, except for Mexico, is also a member of the G77.

See also 

 Non-Aligned Movement
 Third World
 Global South
 North–South divide
 South–South cooperation
 G20 developing nations
 Politics of climate change
 List of country groupings
 List of multilateral free-trade agreements
 Nozipho Mxakato-Diseko

Notes

References

External links

 
 Official website of the Group of 24

G7 summits
United Nations coalitions and unofficial groups
China and the United Nations
Organizations established in 1964
Economic country classifications